Kadukkampalayam is a panchayat village in Gobichettipalayam taluk in Erode District of Tamil Nadu state, India. It is about 9 km from Gobichettipalayam and 27 km from district headquarters Erode. The village is located on the road connecting Gobichettipalayam with Erode. Kadukkampalayam has a population of about 2467.

References

Villages in Erode district